Belgioioso or Belgiojoso may refer to:

 Belgioioso, Lombardy, a town in Lombardy, Italy
 Belgioioso Cheese, an artisanal cheese manufacturer, corporate headquarters in Denmark, Wisconsin, USA
 Giovan Giacomo Barbiano di Belgioioso (1565 — 1626), military commander in Habsburg service
 Ludovico, Count di Belgiojoso (1728 — 1801), Austrian diplomat and Lieutenant Field Marshal
 Cristina Trivulzio Belgiojoso (1808 – 1871), Countess of Belgioioso (or Belgiojoso)